Jim Saric is an American professional angler, best known as the editor of Musky Hunter Magazine, and Musky Hunter Television Show.  He has many large sponsors, including Ranger Boats and Mercury Marine.

Musky Hunter
Saric is the publisher, editor, and owner of Musky Hunter Magazine, the largest Musky fishing publication in North America. In January 2007, Saric aired the first season of his television show, the Musky Hunter, the first television show dedicated to Musky fishing.

References

American fishers
Living people
Year of birth missing (living people)
Place of birth missing (living people)